Giardinetti is an underground station of Line C of the Rome Metro. It is located along the Via Casilina, at the intersection with Via degli Orafi and Via della Fattoria di Torrenova, in the Roman district of Giardinetti, near the Grande Raccordo Anulare. Construction of the station started in 2007 and it was opened on 9 November 2014. The homonymous terminus of the Rome–Giardinetti railway line was relocated within 500 metres from the Metro station.

References

External links

Rome Metro Line C stations
Railway stations opened in 2014
2014 establishments in Italy
Railway stations in Italy opened in the 21st century